Marken (Marken's dialect: Mereke) is a village in the municipality of Waterland in the province of North Holland, Netherlands. It had a population of 1,745 as of 2021, and occupies a peninsula in the Markermeer. It was, until 1957, an island in the former Zuiderzee. The characteristic wooden houses of Marken are a tourist attraction.

History

Early years
Marken was an island in the Zuiderzee.

For some time during the later 19th and early 20th centuries, Marken and its inhabitants were the focus of considerable attention by folklorists, ethnographers and physical anthropologists, who regarded the small fishing town as a relic of the traditional native culture that was destined to disappear as modernization of the Netherlands gained pace. Among them were Johann Friedrich Blumenbach who examined a human skull from the island which he called Batavus genuinus; and was the Belgian painter Xavier Mellery who stayed in Marken at the request of Charles De Coster. Mellery was asked to create illustrative work and delivered several intimist works.

Cornelis Lely's designs incorporated the island into a proposed Markerwaard. A partial dike, built in 1941 in the north, is the first phase of that project which was stopped by World War II.

Recent times
The island appeared as a location in the 1970 film Puppet on a Chain. In 1983, the Marker Museum about the history of the island was opened. Marken was a separate municipality until 1991, when it was merged into Waterland.

Geography 
Marken is in the municipality of Waterland in the east of the province of North Holland in the west of the Netherlands. Marken is a peninsula in the Markermeer, of which is it is the namesake, and is connected to the mainland of North Holland by a causeway.

References

External links

  Marken at the website of the municipality of Waterland
 
 Tourist Information about Marken

 
Former islands of the Netherlands
Former municipalities of North Holland
Islands of North Holland
Populated places in North Holland
Waterland